Local Government (Shires) Act 1905 was a landmark New South Wales statute notable for the compulsory incorporation of local government areas for around 40% of the area of New South Wales. The Act created 134 rural shires, many surrounding a small urban area separately and voluntarily incorporated under the Municipalities Act 1858 and the following Municipalities Act 1867 and Municipalities Act 1897 As well as the compulsory incorporation of rural areas, the Local Government (Shires) Act repealed the Municipalities Act - bringing local government under one legislative framework.

The Act provided the newly constituted Shires with a limited set of powers; to act as a roads board and to provide other necessary local functions such as nightsoil collection and building control. Rates were charged on what has been described as a "benefit related" basis based on the unimproved capital value of the land on the "assumption ... that land values should reflect the benefits accrued from public expenditure, such as road building and maintenance". This rating methodology encouraged development as property that had been developed and improved paid no more in rates than unimproved properties.

In the development of the Act, a Local Government Commission was established to determine the nature of the compulsory incorporation. The commission's initial report was released in March 1905, before the Act was proclaimed. It recommended the establishment of 131 areas, 15 additions to existing municipalities and 2 new municipalities. After considering objections, the Commission recommended 134 areas, to be called "Shires" and 32 additions to existing municipalities. The commission also provided the name for each Shire, avoiding where possible the use of the names of existing municipalities and usually using the name of some local, natural feature.

The Act was repealed with the passing of the Local Government Act 1919.

Shires established under the Act
The following are the original 134 Shires proclaimed on 7 March 1906 per the Act. Over time most of these Shires were amalgamated either with each other or with its associated municipality.

References

1905 in Australian law
New South Wales legislation
Local government areas of New South Wales
History of local government in Australia
1900s in New South Wales
Local government legislation in Australia